Ferdynand Ignacy Stokowski (26 August 1776, in Sierpowie – 1827) was a Polish officer in the French army of the Napoleonic Wars. He was one of the squadron commanders of the Polish 1st Light Cavalry Regiment of the Imperial Guard and made a baron de l'Empire in 1811, before being dismissed from the French army with the rank of brigadier general.

External links 
 S. Kirkor, Słownik oficerów legii nadwiślańskiej i pułków ułanów nadwiślańskich 

1776 births
1827 deaths
French commanders of the Napoleonic Wars
Polish commanders of the Napoleonic Wars
Barons of the First French Empire
French generals